Hartwell F. Jordan (born December 8, 1961) is a sailor from Oakland, California, United States. who represented his country at the 2000 Summer Olympics in Sydney, Australia as crew member in the Soling. With helmsman Jeff Madrigali and fellow crew member Craig Healy they took the 9th place. 

His mother, Barbara Stark (Jordan), competed in swimming at the 1952 Olympic Games in Helsinki.

References

External links
 
 
 
 

1961 births
Living people
American male sailors (sport)
Soling class world champions
North American Champions Soling
Olympic sailors of the United States
Sailors at the 2000 Summer Olympics – Soling
People from Oakland, California